Safety and Health in Agriculture Convention, 2001 is  an International Labour Organization Convention.

It was established in 2001, with the preamble stating:
Noting the Tripartite Declaration of Principles concerning Multinational Enterprises and Social Policy as well as the relevant codes of practice, in particular the code of practice on recording and notification of occupational accidents and diseases, 1996, and the code of practice on safety and health in forestry work, 1998, and

Having decided upon the adoption of certain proposals with regard to safety and health in agriculture,...

Ratifications
As of 2022, the convention has been ratified by 21 states.

ILO's OSH Meeting (2009) 
In accordance with the decisions taken by the governing body of the International Labor Organization, a meeting of experts in the field of occupational safety and health (OSH) at work in the agricultural sector was held in Geneva in 2009. The purpose of the meeting was to discuss a draft code of conduct for agricultural safety and health. Based on ILO's Safety and Health in Agriculture Convention (2001) codes of practice are technical standards that provide practical guidance for certain sectors or topics. Existing ILO standards, conventions and recommendations are often supplemented or expanded, but these additions and expansions are not binding, unlike conventions. Detailed technical advice on the sector or topic is essential when putting occupational safety and health (OSH) into practice.  It is important that compliance with occupational safety and health (OSH) standards for female workers are differentiated. As the majority of agricultural workers are women, this code takes into account the gender-specific challenges of occupational safety and health (OSH) in agriculture.

ILO's OSH Related Scientific Research (2018) 
A scientific study by Occupational Safety and Health Research Institute (OSHRI) in 2018 used SWOT analysis to analyze legislation on occupational safety and health in low- and middle-income countries. Under the ILO’s Safety and Health in Agriculture Convention (2001), the necessary changes have been identified in order to develop international best practice. Additional laws and interventions were envisaged in the summary of the analysis. Although the agricultural sector employed more than 70% of the population in the countries surveyed, most of them did not yet have legislation on health and safety at work in the sector. Laws do not place enough emphasis on creating a fair position for women, are fragmented among different government agencies and are incomplete, outdated, and not sufficiently deterrent to potential violators. The authors of the scientific study had concluded that the legal framework needs to be renewed and that legal harmonization is needed.

References

External links 
Text.
Ratifications.

Health treaties
International Labour Organization conventions
Occupational safety and health treaties
Treaties concluded in 2001
Treaties entered into force in 2002
Treaties of Argentina
Treaties of Belgium
Treaties of Bosnia and Herzegovina
Treaties of Burkina Faso
Treaties of Fiji
Treaties of Finland
Treaties of Ghana
Treaties of Kyrgyzstan
Treaties of Moldova
Treaties of Luxembourg
Treaties of Portugal
Treaties of São Tomé and Príncipe
Treaties of Slovakia
Treaties of Sweden
Treaties of Ukraine
Treaties of Uruguay
Agricultural treaties
2001 in labor relations